"Ganas Locas" is a 2016 song by American singer Prince Royce, featuring Puerto Rican singer Farruko. The song was released on July 14, 2017 as the fifth single taken from Royce's fifth studio album, Five (2017).

Music video 
The music video premiered on July 14, 2017 on Prince Royce's Vevo account on YouTube. The music video has surpassed over 24 million views on the platform.

Live performances 
Prince Royce performed "Ganas Locas" with Farruko at Latin American music awards in 2017.

Charts

Certifications

References

2017 singles
2016 songs
Prince Royce songs
Sony Music Latin singles
Spanish-language songs
Male vocal duets
Farruko songs